Julius Caesar is a lava-flooded lunar impact crater with a low, irregular, and heavily worn wall. Its diameter is 85 km. It was named after Roman statesman Julius Caesar. It is located to the west of Mare Tranquillitatis, and directly southeast of the crater Manilius on the Mare Vaporum. To the east is the rounded Sosigenes.

The interior floor of Julius Caesar is relatively level, especially in the southwest half. The northern half of the interior has a lower albedo (darker) than the south. Most likely the floor has been covered or modified by ejecta from the impact that created the Imbrium basin. There are a number of crater remnants overlapping the rim along the south and northeast edges. A low ridge crosses the floor across the northeast sections of the crater.

Satellite craters
By convention these features are identified on lunar maps by placing the letter on the side of the crater midpoint that is closest to Julius Caesar.

References

External links

Julius Caesar at The Moon Wiki
 
 
 
  - also features nearby Boscovich Crater

Impact craters on the Moon